The FIVB Volleyball Women's World Championship is an international volleyball competition contested by the senior women's national teams of the members of  (FIVB), the sport's global governing body. The initial gap between championships was variable, but since 1970 they have been awarded every four years. The current champions are the Serbia, which won their second title at the 2022 tournament in Netherlands and Poland.

The current format of the competition involves a qualification phase, which currently takes place over the preceding three years, to determine which teams qualify for the tournament phase, which is often called the World Championship Finals. 24 teams, including the automatically qualifying host nation(s), compete in the tournament phase for the title at venues within the host nation(s) over a period of about a month.

The 19 World Championship tournaments have been won by eight different national teams. Soviet Union have won five times. The other World Championship winners are Japan and Cuba, with three titles each; China, Russia and Serbia, with two titles each; and Italy and the United States, with one title each.

The 2022 World Championship was co-hosted by Netherlands and Poland.

On 15 October 2022, FIVB announced the expansion of the World Championships and the changes to their common competition formula. A total of 32 teams are to compete for future editions of the tournament.

History

Origins
The history of the World Championship goes back to the beginnings of volleyball as a professional, high level sport. One of the first concrete measures taken by the FIVB after its foundation in 1947 was the establishment of an international competition involving teams from more than one continent. In 1949, the first edition of the Men's World Championship was played in Prague, Czechoslovakia. At that point, the tournament was still restricted to Europe.

Three years later, a women's version was introduced; the events were synchronized and expanded to include nations from Asia, and began to be held in 4-year cycles. By the following edition, there were also teams from South, Central and North America.

Since volleyball was to be added to the Olympic Program in 1964, the 4-cycles were advanced in 2 years after the fourth edition (1960), so that the World Championship may alternate with the Summer Olympics. As of 1970, teams from Africa also took part in the competition, and the original goal of having members from all five continental confederations in the games was achieved.

The number of teams involved in the games has changed significantly over the years. Following volleyball's increase in popularity, they raised steadily to over 20 in the 1970s and part of the 1980s, were then cut short to 16 in the 1990s, and finally set up in 24 after 2002. Today, the World Championship is the most comprehensive of all events organized by the FIVB, and arguably the second most important, surpassed in prestige only by the Olympic Games.

Until 1974, the host nation of the tournament organized both the men's and the women's events, with the single exception of the 1966/1967 games, which took place in different years. Since 1978, this practice has been only occasionally observed, for instance, in 1998 and in the 2006 edition, which was held, as the former was, in Japan.

Winners
If the titles of the Women's World Championship are evenly distributed between European and non-Europeans national teams, the situation is quite different when nations are taken into account. Historically, four national teams dominated at the World Championships — Russia (formerly participated as Soviet Union), Japan, China and Cuba (except for Italy's single — and for many, unexpected — victory in 2002). However, at last tournaments, two national teams became triumphants for the first time — United States in 2014 and Serbia in 2018.

The Soviets made a most impressive start by winning the first three editions of the tournament: 1952, 1956, 1960. They were halfway to making it four, since the following edition was to be played in Moscow. Former runners-up Japan, nevertheless, was the champions in 1962 and interrupted the winning streak, repeating the performance in 1967, when the Soviet Union national team did not participate.

The teams faced each other again in 1970, and this time the Soviet Union beat their opponents to collect the gold. In the following edition, Japan took revenge and defeated the Soviet Union in straight sets. Then something extraordinary happened: the world watched astonished as a young Cuban squad left behind the two longtime rivals and secured the first important volleyball title for a continent other than Europe or Asia.

The early 1980s saw the rise of a new Asian force: led by superstar Lang Ping, China stamped their mark on the World Championship's history by winning two editions in a row (1982 and 1986). They also made it to the finals in 1990, but were overpowered by the Soviet Union in their last participation at the competition.

Cuba's 1978 title finally fructified in an aggressive style of play that virtually dominated the 1990s. Led by powerplayers Regla Torres, Mireya Luis and Regla Bell, the Caribbeans won the 1994 and 1998 editions of the World Championship, beating newbies as well as tradition rivals such as Russia and China.

In spite of being appointed as favourites in 2002, China lost at the semifinals to a rising Italy, which would eventually win the final against United States

In 2006, favourites Brazil couldn't stop Russia and lost the gold medal match in a shocking final tie-breaker. In 2010, Russia once again defeated Brazil in a 5th-set tie-breaker.

In 2014, the United States made it to the finals after an astonishing straight-set win against the 2012 Olympic champion and 2006 and 2010 runner-up Brazil. China, on the other hand, reached the championship after winning over hosts Italy in a four-set fashion. The finals saw two former World champions – Lang Ping and Karch Kiraly – at the helm of the champion squads. United States' momentum carried them to a 3–1 victory over the young Chinese squad, earning the first ever World title for the USA women's team after finishing as bridesmaids in several editions of the World Championship, World Cup and the Olympic Games.

In 2018, Serbia achieved historical victory after defeating Italy in a 5th-set tie-breaker. It became greatest international success for the short history of this national team. In 2022, Serbia retained their title after winning all 12 matches at the tournament including a 3–0 victory over Brazil in the final match.

As of 2022, 19 editions of the women's Volleyball World Championship have been played: 10 went to European teams, five to Asian teams (three times to Japan and two times to China), and four to American teams (three times to Cuba and once to United States).

Competition formula

Qualification

Previous qualification

New qualification

Final tournament
The competition formula of the FIVB World Championship has been constantly changed to fit the different number of teams that participate in each edition. The following rules usually apply:

 Twenty-four teams participate in each event. 
 Qualification procedures for the World Championship are long and strenuous, lasting over two years. 
 Host nations are always pre-qualified.
 The number of spots available per confederation is determined by the FIVB: Europe has usually the highest, and Africa or South America the lowest.
 To participate in the event, a team must survive a number of qualification tournaments depending on its position in the FIVB World Rankings. Low-ranked teams may have to engage in up to three tournaments to be granted a berth; high-ranked teams typically play only one.
 The competition is divided in at least two phases: a preliminary round and a final round. Depending on the number of participating teams, one or more intermediary rounds may also be required.
 In the preliminary round, teams are organized in pools. Each team plays one match against all other teams in its pool. 
 When all the matches of the preliminary round have been played, the top n teams in each pool qualify for the following round(s), and the remaining ones leave the competition.  The value of n depends on the number of participating teams and the format that will be employed in the finals.
 The FIVB has tried various different formats for the final round(s). For some years now (2004), there seems to be a  consensus that at least semifinals and finals must be played according to the Olympic format. 
 Quarterfinals may consist of groups of teams playing against each other, or of direct confrontation; in the latter case additional intermediary rounds might be required to reduce the number of surviving teams to eight.
 The tournament now implements a line-up of fourteen players, and four reserve players in case of injuries.

New formula
A totally new competition formula was announced by FIVB in October 2022. A total of 32 teams will compete in the World Championship. The teams will be divided into 8 groups of 4 teams for the round-robin phase with 2 best teams per group moving into the direct knockout phase: round of 16, quarterfinals, semi-finals and final.

Results summary

Medals summary

Hosts
List of hosts by number of championships hosted.

* = co-hosts.

MVP by edition
1952–78 – Not awarded 
1982 – 
1986 – 
1990 – 
1994 – 
1998 – 
2002 – 
2006 – 
2010 – 
2014 – 
2018 – 
2022 –

Most successful players

Boldface denotes active volleyball players and highest medal count among all players (including these who not included in these tables) per type.

Multiple gold medalists

* Till now, Lyudmila Buldakova (Meshcheryakova) remains the only female volleyball player to have won four World Championship medals

See also

Volleyball at the Summer Olympics
FIVB Volleyball Men's World Championship
FIVB Volleyball Women's World Cup
FIVB Volleyball World Grand Champions Cup
FIVB Volleyball World Grand Prix
FIVB Volleyball Women's Nations League
FIVB Volleyball Women's U23 World Championship
FIVB Volleyball Women's U20 World Championship
FIVB Volleyball Girls' U18 World Championship
List of Indoor Volleyball World Medalists

References

External links

 
Volleyball World Championship History

 

 
 
V
International women's volleyball competitions
Women's
Quadrennial sporting events